Richard "Snakehips" Dudanski, also known as Richard Nother, is an English drummer who was a member of a number of seminal British proto-punk, punk and post-punk bands, including The 101ers, The Raincoats, Public Image Ltd., Tymon Dogg and the Fools, and Basement 5.   He was invited by fellow 101er Joe Strummer to become a member of an early incarnation of The Clash.

References

1952 births
Living people
Public Image Ltd members
English punk rock drummers
Protopunk musicians
British post-punk musicians
English people of Polish descent
Musicians from London
The Raincoats members
Basement 5 members
The 101ers members